Cole City is an extinct town in Dade County, in the U.S. state of Georgia. The GNIS classifies it as a populated place. A variant name was "Cole".

History
The Georgia General Assembly incorporated Cole City as a town in 1873, with municipal corporate limits extending in a  radius from the main entrance of the Dade Coal Company coal mine. The community was named after Colonel E. W. Cole. The town's charter was officially dissolved in 1995.

See also
List of ghost towns in Georgia

References

Former municipalities in Georgia (U.S. state)
Geography of Dade County, Georgia
Ghost towns in Georgia (U.S. state)
Populated places disestablished in 1995